Hyposmocoma philocharis is a species of moth of the family Cosmopterigidae. It was first described by Edward Meyrick in 1915. It is endemic to the Hawaiian island of Oahu. The type locality is the Koʻolau Range, near Honolulu.

References

philocharis
Endemic moths of Hawaii
Moths described in 1915